Southern Pacific Railroad's AC-1 class of cab forward steam locomotives consisted of locomotives rebuilt from MC-1 and MC-2 class locomotives that were originally built by Baldwin Locomotive Works in 1909. The MC-2 class was the first class of locomotives built and delivered to SP as cab forward locomotives in late 1909. The AC-1 class was the first of the successful AC series of cab forward locomotives that numbered nearly 200 in total on the SP. Southern Pacific No. 4002 was rebuilt in June 1923 as a Cab Forward.

Their rebuilds into class AC-1 was around June 1931. SP used the rebuilt locomotives through the traffic rush of World War II, then the SP removed them from the roster soon after the war.  They were all retired from active service by 1949 and were scrapped soon after their retirement.  The last locomotive of this class that was scrapped was number 4014 on April 12, 1949. None of the original AC-1's were preserved. The only cab forward left in the United States of America is SP No. 4294, an AC-12 built in March 1944.

References 
 
 

Specific

Baldwin locomotives
Mallet locomotives
AC-01
2-8-8-2 locomotives
Simple articulated locomotives
Steam locomotives of the United States
Scrapped locomotives
Standard gauge locomotives of the United States
Cab forward steam locomotives
Freight locomotives